At the 1919 Far Eastern Championship Games, the athletics events were held in Manila, Philippines in May. A total of 18 athletics events were contested at the competition. The five-mile road race was held for the last time, being replaced by a five-mile track race at the following edition.

The host nation, the Philippines, dominated in the sport, winning thirteen of the eighteen gold medals on offer. The Japanese took three gold medals, reaching the podium in running events only. China's two golds came in the combined track and field events and most of its other medals came in field events.

Fortunato Catalon of the Philippines defended both his 100-yard dash and 220-yard dash titles from the 1917 edition. Two of his team mates, shot putter Alejo Alvarez and high hurdles specialist Constantino Rabaya, were the only other athletes to repeat as champions. Alvarez also won the discus throw title on this occasion. Japan's best athlete was Kiyoji Ikuta, who won the mile run and five-mile titles. Chu Ente was the only Chinese to top the athletics podium at the games, and he did so twice by winning the decathlon and pentathlon.

Medal summary

References

Results
Far Eastern Championships. GBR Athletics. Retrieved on 2014-12-18.

1919
Far Eastern Championship Games
1919 Far Eastern Championship Games